Edward Arthur Bourke (17 February 1904 – 27 November 1952) was an Australian rules footballer who played for Richmond and South Melbourne in the Victorian Football League (VFL) during the 1920s.

Often playing at centre half back, Bourke spent his early football years with Muckatah, Tungamah and Brunswick.

He kicked three goals on debut for Richmond in the opening round of the 1924 VFL season and participated in the round robin finals series which took place that year.

After crossing to South Melbourne without success in 1927, Bourke missed the entire 1928 football season while he waited for a clearance to the Victorian Football Association. He was signed by Sandringham in 1929 and won the Recorder Cup in his first season.

Bourke later served as captain-coach of Yarraville and Ararat.

References

External links

1904 births
Richmond Football Club players
Sydney Swans players
Brunswick Football Club players
Sandringham Football Club players
Yarraville Football Club players
Yarraville Football Club coaches
Ararat Football Club players
Australian rules footballers from Victoria (Australia)
1952 deaths